Goniodiscaster scaber is a species of sea stars in the family Oreasteridae. Its scientific name was first published in 1859 by Karl August Möbius, who placed it in the genus Goniodiscus (now Culcita).

References

Oreasteridae
Animals described in 1859